Maria Pia Conte (born 10 March 1944) is an Italian former actress.

Life and career 
Born Maria Pia Vaccarezza in Genoa, the daughter of a carpenter, Conte spent her youth in Sestri Levante before moving to Genoa to study classical ballet. After a few experiences as a child actress, she was first noted as a fotoromanzi model, then she decided to pursue an acting career and enrolled the Centro Sperimentale di Cinematografia, graduating in 1962. Conte made her acting debut in 1961, in the Marco Bellocchio's short film La colpa e la pena, then she appeared in a number of films and TV-series, often in secondary roles, being sometimes credited as Mary P. Count.  She was also occasionally active as a voice actress and a dubber. She retired in the late 1970s.

Filmography

References

External links 
 

Italian film actresses
Italian television actresses
Italian stage actresses
20th-century Italian actresses
1944 births
Actors from Genoa
Living people
Centro Sperimentale di Cinematografia alumni
Spaghetti Western actresses